John Howard Mummery, CBE, FRCS (18 January 1847 – 30 August 1926) was a British dentist and microscopist.

He was the son of John Rigden Mummery, a dentist, qualified MRCS (Eng) in 1870 and as a dentist in 1873. He joined his father in practice at Cavendish Place in London and became one of the best known dental surgeons of his day, becoming President of the British Dental Association in 1899 and of the F.D.I. in 1914. During World War I, although aged over 70, he was appointed Registrar and Superintendent of the Maxillo-facial Hospital at Kennington. He married Mary Lily Lockhart, the daughter of William Lockhart (1811–1897), famed medical missionary and fellow of the Royal College of Surgeons (UK).  Mummery wrote at least two texts, Microanatomy of the Teeth (Henry Frowde, Oxford University Press: 1919) and Microscopic and General Anatomy of the Teeth: Human and Comparative.  He lived at 79 Albert Bridge Road, Wandsworth, London at the time the first text was published.

His wife, Mary, died from acute pneumonia on 24 May 1897 at the age of 48 at Whitby. The British Dental Association presents a Howard Mummery Prize for dental research, which was first awarded to J H Scott in 1963. Mummery died on 30 August 1926, whilst on a visit to Cornwall.

His son John Lockhart-Mummery, and grandson Sir Hugh Evelyn Lockhart-Mummery, were both surgeons.

References

1847 births
1926 deaths
English dentists
Microscopists
Commanders of the Order of the British Empire
Fellows of the Royal College of Surgeons
Alumni of University College London